Grégoire Saucy (born 26 December 1999) is a Swiss racing driver and the champion of the 2021 Formula Regional European Championship. He is currently racing with ART Grand Prix in the 2023 FIA Formula 3 Championship.

Career

V de V Challenge Monoplace 
Saucy's first year in single seaters was in 2016 when he drove for Luxembourger team RC Formula in the V de V Challenge Monoplace. The 3 podiums Saucy scored on his way to 4th in the championship were all second places in the three races at Circuit de Nevers Magny-Cours.

ADAC Formula 4 
Saucy raced his first season in ADAC Formula 4 in 2018 where he raced as a guest driver for Jenzer Motorsport like he did the year previously in the Italian F4 championship. In the two races he raced he finished 11th and 5th. In 2019 he raced for R-ace GP where he finished on the podium twice. Saucy ended the season in 9th, 28 points behind his Russian teammate Michael Belov.

Italian Formula 4 

Jenzer Motorsport signed Saucy to race for them 2017 as a guest driver in the Italian F4 Championship. In the 6 races he partook in, Saucy finished in points scoring positions twice both at Mugello Circuit. In 2018 Saucy once again raced Jenzer until the final race of the season where he made the switch to the French team R-ace GP, his best result was 5th while he also scored a double pole position at round 3 in Monza. Following on from the last race of 2018, Saucy drove for R-ace GP in 2019 where he finished the season in 15th while only competing in 3 rounds.

Formula Renault Eurocup

2017 

Saucy's first year in Formula Renault was in 2017 when he raced for AVF by Adrián Vallés.

2019 
Saucy raced in the final two rounds in the 2019 Formula Renault Eurocup season for R-ace GP where he finished 5th in his first race and 12th in the next 3.

2020 
In 2020 Saucy raced for ART Grand Prix alongside Paul Aron and Victor Martins, where he came seventh in the standings, having finished on the podium on two occasions.

Formula Regional European Championship 

For 2021, Saucy remained with ART Grand Prix competing in the Formula Regional European Championship by Alpine, the merger of the Formula Renault Eurocup and the Formula Regional European Championship. His teammates are Gabriele Minì and Thomas ten Brinke. He started the season off in a dominant fashion, winning the second race of the season at Imola and following that up with two victories in Barcelona. After a point-less round in Monaco and a disqualification from the lead in France, courtesy of a part having been reassembled in the wrong direction following post-race scrutineering, he returned to winning ways in the second race at Paul Ricard. The Swiss driver dominated the next weekend at the Zandvoort Circuit with two pole positions and two race wins. Saucy started the first race at Spa-Francorchamps in 24th courtesy of a mixed-up qualifying session, but he was able to fight back to eighth by the checkered flag. He started the second race from pole and achieved his seventh victory of the season. In the seventh round of the campaign Saucy once again scored a race win, this time inheriting the top step of the podium after a penalty was handed to initial winner Franco Colapinto for track limit breaches. Saucy scored his first podium that was not a win in the next round, coming third in race 2 in Valencia, and went into the penultimate round with a 78-point gap on his closest rival Hadrien David. He then finished the first race at Mugello in fifth place, and with his French adversary ending up 23rd, Saucy was crowned champion with three races left to go. Saucy ended the season with a total of eight victories, eight podiums, 277 points and ten podiums, meaning that he stood on the podium after precisely half of all races.

FIA Formula 3 Championship

2022 

In November 2021 Saucy partook in the post-season test of the FIA Formula 3 Championship with ART Grand Prix, partnering Victor Martins and Juan Manuel Correa. A few days after the test he was announced by ART to be one of the team's drivers for the 2022 season. After starting out the season with a retirement caused by a collision with teammate Martins, Saucy scored his first podium in the category in the feature race in Sakhir. At the next round in Imola, the Swiss driver was on course for another third place, before being taken out by Ollie Bearman on the final lap. From there, Saucy experienced a drop in performances, having to wait until the sprint race in Hungary for his next points. He followed that up with an inconsistent end to the season, which included points finishes in Zandvoort and Monza, but also a pair of retirements, after which he stated that his results masked the underlying pace him and the team had. Saucy ended his season 15th in the standings, finishing behing his teammates Martins and Correa.

2023 
In November 2022 ART Grand Prix announced Saucy would remain with the team for the 2023 season.

Karting record

Karting career summary

Racing record

Racing career summary 

† As Saucy was a guest driver, he was ineligible for points.
* Season still in progress.

Complete V de V Challenge Monoplace results 
(key) (Races in bold indicate pole position) (Races in italics indicate fastest lap)

Complete Formula Renault Eurocup results 
(key) (Races in bold indicate pole position) (Races in italics indicate fastest lap)

† As Saucy was a guest driver, he was ineligible for points.
‡ Half points awarded as less than 75% of race distance was completed.

Complete Italian F4 Championship results
(key) (Races in bold indicate pole position) (Races in italics indicate fastest lap)

† As Saucy was a guest driver, he was ineligible for points.

Complete ADAC Formula 4 Championship results
(key) (Races in bold indicate pole position) (Races in italics indicate fastest lap)

† As Saucy was a guest driver, he was ineligible for points.

Complete Toyota Racing Series results 
(key) (Races in bold indicate pole position) (Races in italics indicate fastest lap)

Complete Formula Regional European Championship results 
(key) (Races in bold indicate pole position) (Races in italics indicate fastest lap)

Complete FIA Formula 3 Championship results 
(key) (Races in bold indicate pole position) (Races in italics indicate points for the fastest lap of top ten finishers)

References

External links
 

1999 births
Living people
Swiss racing drivers
ADAC Formula 4 drivers
Italian F4 Championship drivers
Formula Renault Eurocup drivers
ART Grand Prix drivers
Formula Regional European Championship drivers
FIA Formula 3 Championship drivers
Toyota Racing Series drivers
Jenzer Motorsport drivers
R-ace GP drivers
AV Formula drivers
RC Formula drivers